Wolf Gruner (born 13 December 1960) is a German academic who has been the Founding Director of the Center for Advanced Genocide Research at the University of Southern California Shoah Foundation since 2014. He currently holds the Shapell-Guerin Chair in Jewish Studies and is also Professor of History at USC. Since 2017, he is a member of the Academic Advisory Committee of the Center for Advanced Holocaust Studies at the United States Holocaust Memorial Museum.

Works

Edited

References

1960 births
Living people
21st-century German historians
Historians of the Holocaust in Germany
Historians of the Holocaust in Bohemia and Moravia
University of Southern California faculty
Historians of Bolivia
German emigrants to the United States